Robert Deng from the Singapore Management University, Singapore was named Fellow of the Institute of Electrical and Electronics Engineers (IEEE) in 2016 for contributions to security algorithms, protocols and systems.

References 

Fellow Members of the IEEE
Living people
Year of birth missing (living people)